Thomas Graham (5 December 1943 – 16 April 2015) was a Scottish Labour Party politician. A native of Glasgow, Graham worked as an engineer before serving on Strathclyde Regional Council from 1978 to 1987.

He was elected in 1987 as the Member of Parliament (MP) for Renfrew West and Inverclyde, defeating the Conservative incumbent Anna McCurley.  After favourable boundary changes in 1997, he was elected for the new seat of Renfrewshire West.

Early years 
Graham previously worked for Rolls-Royce as an engineer and as a shop steward for the engineering union AEEU.

McMaster suicide 
Following the suicide of his parliamentary colleague Gordon McMaster in July 1997, a long investigation was launched, since in his suicide note McMaster had accused Graham of smearing him that he had a homosexual affair with a 17-year-old employee of Graham's. In September 1998, Graham was expelled from the Labour Party for "bringing the party into disrepute", despite his categorical denials of any wrongdoing. He became an independent and described himself as a 'Scottish Labour' MP. 

After his expulsion when Graham was asked where he would be sitting in the House of Commons, he replied, 'On my bum.'  In fact, he actually sat on the opposition benches of the Commons but continued to vote with the government on many issues.  It was thought that Graham would stand again at the 2001 general election, but he did not do so and quietly retired. His successor was Labour's Jim Sheridan. He died on 20 April 2015 following a brief illness.

References

Guardian bio 
ALBA.org 
WSWS

External links
 Graham's maiden speech, in a debate on the Scottish Development Agency Bill

1943 births
Politicians from Glasgow
People from Renfrewshire
Scottish Labour MPs
Scottish Labour councillors
Independent politicians in Scotland
UK MPs 1987–1992
UK MPs 1992–1997
UK MPs 1997–2001
Independent members of the House of Commons of the United Kingdom
2015 deaths
Politicians affected by a party expulsion process